Gustavia longepetiolata is a species of woody plant in the family Lecythidaceae. It is found only in Brazil. It is threatened by habitat loss.

References

longepetiolata
Endemic flora of Brazil
Flora of Pará
Endangered plants
Taxonomy articles created by Polbot